Elwood B. Huyke (born September 28, 1937 in San Juan, Puerto Rico) is a minor league baseball player, coach, and manager.

Huyke played for the Hastings Giants, a San Francisco Giants minor league affiliate, in 1959. He played for the Monterrey Sultanes of the Mexican League in 1960. Huyke also played for the Puerto Rico national baseball team in the 1960 Caribbean Series. Huyke played in the Kansas City / Oakland Athletics system from 1961 through 1968, and for the Pittsburgh Pirates system from 1969 until he retired after the 1973 season. He was featured in an article in the June 14, 1971, issue of Sports Illustrated magazine.

In 1974, Huyke began his managerial career. He managed in the Pirates' organization from 1974 through 1989, and 1990 through 2004. He voluntarily stepped down as manager after the 2004 season, remaining with the Gulf Coast League Pirates as a coach. One of Woody's early successes, in 1989, was identifying Tim Wakefield's potential as a knuckleball pitcher (at the time, Wakefield was a light-hitting first baseman) and convincing the Pittsburgh Pirates organization not to release him.

In 2010, Huyke won the Mike Coolbaugh Award for his mentoring of minor league players.

References

External links

1937 births
Living people
Minor league baseball managers
Hastings Giants players
Shreveport Sports players
Portsmouth-Norfolk Tides players
Lewiston Broncs players
Binghamton Triplets players
Dallas Rangers players
Birmingham Barons players
Vancouver Mounties players
Columbus Jets players
Waterbury Pirates players
Sherbrooke Pirates players
Salem Pirates players
Puerto Rican baseball players
Sportspeople from San Juan, Puerto Rico